was a Japanese male tennis player who represented Japan in the Davis Cup and Olympic Games. He competed in the singles event at the 1924 Summer Olympics, reaching the fourth round in which he lost to Henri Cochet. With compatriot Asaji Honda he competed in the men's doubles event and reached the second round. In 1923 he won the Orange Invitation tournament against Frank Anderson.

He competed in the 1924 Wimbledon Championships and reached the third round in the singles event and the second round in the doubles.

References

External links
 
 
 

1897 births
1974 deaths
Japanese male tennis players
Olympic tennis players of Japan
Tennis players at the 1924 Summer Olympics
20th-century Japanese people